The 2016–17 Coppa Italia, also known as TIM Cup for sponsorship reasons, was the 70th edition of the national cup in Italian football.
Juventus successfully defended its title by defeating Lazio 2–0 in the final, becoming the first team to win the trophy in three consecutive years.

Participating teams

Serie A (20 teams)

Atalanta
Bologna
Cagliari
Chievo
Crotone
Empoli
Fiorentina
Genoa
Internazionale
Juventus
Lazio
Milan
Napoli
Palermo
Pescara
Roma
Sampdoria
Sassuolo
Torino
Udinese

Serie B (22 teams)

Ascoli
Avellino
Bari
Benevento
Brescia
Carpi
Cesena
Cittadella
Frosinone
Latina
Novara
Perugia
Pisa
Pro Vercelli
Salernitana
SPAL
Spezia
Ternana
Trapani
Hellas Verona
Vicenza
Virtus Entella

Lega Pro (27 teams)

Alessandria
Ancona
Arezzo
Bassano Virtus
Carrarese
Casertana
Como
Cosenza
Cremonese
FeralpiSalò
Fidelis Andria
Foggia
Juve Stabia
Lecce
Livorno
Maceratese
Matera
Messina
Modena
Padova
Pontedera
Pordenone
Reggiana
Siena
Südtirol
Teramo
Tuttocuoio

Serie D (9 teams)

Altovicentino
Campodarsego
Caronnese
Fermana
Francavilla
Frattese
Grosseto
Montecatini
Seregno

source: legaseriea.it

Format and seeding
Teams entered the competition at various stages, as follows:
 First phase (one-legged fixtures)
 First round: 36 teams from Lega Pro and Serie D started the tournament
 Second round: the eighteen winners from the previous round were joined by the 22 Serie B teams
 Third round: the twenty winners from the second round met the twelve Serie A sides seeded 9–20
 Fourth round: the sixteen winners faced each other
 Second phase
 Round of 16 (one-legged): the eight fourth round winners were inserted into a bracket with the Serie A clubs seeded 1–8
 Quarter-finals (one-legged)
 Semi-finals (two-legged)
 Final (one-legged)

Round dates
The schedule of each round was as follows:

First stage

First round
A total of 36 teams from Lega Pro and Serie D competed in this round, eighteen of which advanced to second round. The matches were played between 29 and 31 July 2016.

Second round
A total of forty teams from Serie B and Lega Pro competed in the second round, twenty of which advanced to join twelve teams from Serie A in the third round. The matches were played from 5 to 8 August 2016.

Third round
A total of 32 teams from Serie A, Serie B and Lega Pro competed in the third round, sixteen of which advanced to the fourth round. The matches were played between 12 and 15 August 2016.

Fourth round
Fourth round matches were played between 29 November and 1 December 2016.

Final stage

Bracket

Round of 16
Round of 16 matches were played from 10 to 19 January 2017.

Quarter-finals
Quarter-final matches were played from 24 January to 1 February 2017.

Semi-finals
The first semi-final legs were played on 28 February and 1 March, and the second legs were played on 4 and 5 April 2017.

First leg

Second leg

Final

Top goalscorers

Notes

References

Coppa Italia seasons
Coppa Italia
Italy